Botswana competed in the Olympic Games for the first time at the 1980 Summer Olympics in Moscow, USSR.

Results by event

Athletics
Men's 100 metres
 Lucien Josiah
 Heat — 11.15 (→ did not advance)

Men's 200 metres
 Lucien Josiah
 Heat — 22.45 (→ did not advance)

Men's 400 metres
Joseph Ramotshabe

Men's 800 metres
 Langa Mudongo 
 Heat — 1:52.5 (→ did not advance)

Men's 1,500 metres
Ishmael Mhaladi
 Heat — 3:59.1 (→ did not advance)

Men's 5,000 metres
Robert Chideka

Men's 10,000 metres
Golekane Mosweu
 Heat — 30:38.8 (→ did not advance)

Men's 400 m Hurdles
Wilfred Kareng
 Heat — did not finish (→ did not advance)

See also
 Botswana at the 1982 Commonwealth Games

References
Official Olympic Reports
sports-reference

Nations at the 1980 Summer Olympics
1980
Olympics